First Marshal of the Empire was a military rank established by the Italian Parliament on March 30, 1938.  The highest rank in the Italian military, it was only granted to King Victor Emmanuel III and Duce Benito Mussolini.

Mussolini's decision to create for himself and the King a new military rank created a crisis between himself and Victor Emmanuel III.  For the first time in the history of the House of Savoy, the Prime Minister of Italy bore a rank equal with that of the head of the royal house giving him a mortgage on the high command of the Italian military, a power of the King under the provisions of Albertine Statute. The King considered vetoing the law that created such rank and requested to be advised by Professor Santi Romano, President of the Council of State, who analyzed the law and found it to comply with the Statute; Victor Emmanuel vehemently protested against Romano's opinion, but eventually signed the law and had it promulgated on the Gazzetta Ufficiale.

Following the death of Mussolini (1945) and Victor Emmanuel (1947), the rank was never awarded again. It was formally suppressed on 22 December 2008 by the Fourth Berlusconi Cabinet, even though it had already de facto ceased to exist after World War II.

See also
Marshal (Italy)
Marshal of Italy
Comandante Generale of Italian Blackshirts

Sources 
Montanelli, Cervi Storia d'Italia 1935/1943

References

Military ranks of Italy